"Politically Correct" is the second single by American pop punk group SR-71 from their debut studio album, Now You See Inside. The song reached number 22 on the Billboard Modern Rock Tracks chart. The song was less successful than their breakthrough hit single "Right Now".

Chart positions

References

2000 songs
2001 singles
SR-71 (band) songs
RCA Records singles
Songs written by Mitch Allan